Cyperus austrochrysanthus is a species of sedge that is endemic to Angola.

The species was first formally described by the botanist Kåre Arnstein Lye in 1988.

See also
 List of Cyperus species

References

austrochrysanthus
Plants described in 1988
Flora of Angola
Taxa named by Kåre Arnstein Lye